The Percival Q.6 was a 1930s British communications aircraft built by Percival Aircraft Limited at Luton. Originally, the Percival Q.6 was a civil transport but It was used during the Second World War by the Royal Air Force and Royal Navy as a communications and liaison aircraft. It was a twin-engine, low-wing monoplane with a tailwheel undercarriage.

Design and development
The Percival Type-Q was Percival's first twin-engine aircraft. It was constructed of wood, with plywood and fabric covering. It had a fixed, tailwheel undercarriage, with faired mainwheels, although four of the production machines would be equipped with retractable undercarriage.

Two versions were designed: the Q.4, a four-seat executive transport, and the Q.6, a six-seat feederliner. The Q.4 was not built. The prototype Q.6, registration G-AEYE, first flew on 14 September 1937 at Luton Airport. Production started in 1938, and the first production aircraft, registered G-AFFD, was delivered to Sir Philip Sassoon on 2 March 1938.

Operational history
A small number were exported, including one to the King Ghazi I of Iraq, two to the Lithuanian Ministry of Communications, one to the Australian Civil Aviation Board and two to the Egyptian government in military camouflage. A total of 27 aircraft were built (one prototype and 26 production aircraft).
 
The Royal Air Force bought seven aircraft for communications duties under Air Ministry Specification 25/38; these were unofficially named Petrel. The Egyptian government bought two Q.6s.

In the early months of the Second World War, most of the civil Q.6s were requisitioned for service with the RAF and RN. Two Q.6s of the Lithuanian Air Lines were impressed by the Soviet Air Forces in 1940 and used with Soviet airline Aeroflot on Riga-Velikye Luki or Riga-Moscow lines.

With one exception, all the civilian Q.6s served with the Royal Air Force during the Second World War. Between 1946 and 1947, four requisitioned Q.6s and three Petrels were sold to civilian buyers. These were operated by small UK airlines, as executive transports and flown by private pilot owners.

Variants
Q.4
Four-seat civil executive transport, none built.
Q.6
Six-seat civil feederliner.
Q.6 Mk I
Prototype fitted with wings intended for the Q.4 variant, one built.
Q.6 Mk II
Production variant with fixed landing gear, 12 built.
Q.6 Mk III
Variant with retractable landing gear. four built and one conversion from Mk II.
Q.6 Mk IV
Proposed air survey variant, not built.
Q.6 Mk V
Variant for military communications with a toilet, four passenger seats, nine-built.
Petrel
Name given to Q.6 Mk V military communications aircraft.

Operators

Civilian operators

 British India

King Ghazi I
Iraqi State Railways

Lithuanian Air Lines

Starways
Western Airways

The aircraft was also operated by flying clubs, companies and private individuals.

 Aeroflot in 1940-1941 operated two aircraft captured in June 1940 from Lithuanian Air Lines following the Occupation of the Baltic states.

Military operators

Royal Egyptian Air Force, two aircraft used by the Royal Flight

Royal Iraqi Air Force, one aircraft acquired in 1939

Royal Air Force
No. 24 Squadron RAF
No. 173 Squadron RAF
No. 267 Squadron RAF
No. 510 Squadron RAF
Fleet Air Arm

Survivors
One Q.6, the first production registered G-AFFD, is still current on the United Kingdom Civil Aircraft Register but with an expired certificate of airworthiness. Currently being stored at Seething Airfield, Norwich, Norfolk.
Under restoration to flight condition. This aircraft is believed to be the only remaining example of the aircraft type.

Specifications (Percival Q.6 Petrel)

See also

References

Further reading

External links

 

Petrel
1930s British military transport aircraft
Low-wing aircraft
Aircraft first flown in 1937
Twin piston-engined tractor aircraft